Albert Montañés was the defending champion, but he chose to not defend his 2008 title.
The next champion became other Spaniard player, David Marrero, who won in the final 5–7, 6–4, 6–4, against Antonio Veić.

Seeds

Draw

Final four

Top half

Bottom half

References
 Main Draw
 Qualifying Draw

Mitsubishi Electric Europe Cup - Singles
Internazionali di Monza E Brianza